Mahir Ünsal Eriş (born October 20, 1980) is a contemporary Turkish writer known for his short stories, novels, and translations.

Works
Eriş’s first short story collection, Bangır Bangır Ferdi Çalıyor Evde, was published in 2012. His second book, Olduğu Kadar Güzeldik, was a short story collection as well, which was granted the Sait Faik Short Story Award in 2014.

In his first novel, Dünya Bu Kadar, which was published in 2015, Eriş was exploring new ways of narrative and reflecting his interest in storytelling and modern literature. His most recent short story collections Sarıyaz and Kara Yarısı were published simultaneously in 2019. In 2020, Eriş wrote a serial novel, Gaip for the audiobook streaming service Storytel.

Bibliography

Short Stories
 Bangır Bangır Ferdi Çalıyor Evde, İstanbul, 2012, İletişim Yayınları
 Olduğu Kadar Güzeldik, İstanbul, 2013, İletişim Yayınları
 Sarıyaz, İstanbul, 2019, Can Yayınları
 Kara Yarısı, İstanbul, 2019, Can Yayınları

Novels
 Dünya Bu Kadar, İstanbul, 2015, İletişim Yayınları

Illustrated Novels
 Öbürküler, İstanbul, 2017, Karakarga
 Diğerleri, İstanbul, 2020, Karakarga

Serial Novels
 Gaip, 2020, Storytel

References

External links
Author page (literary agency)

1980 births
Turkish novelists
Turkish short story writers
Turkish translators
Living people